Ipidecla is a genus of butterflies in the family Lycaenidae. The species of this genus are found in the Neotropical realm.

Species
Ipidecla miadora Dyar, 1916
Ipidecla schausi (Godman & Salvin, [1887])
Ipidecla crepundia (Druce, 1909)

External links
"Ipidecla Dyar, 1916" at Markku Savela's Lepidoptera and Some Other Life Forms

Eumaeini
Lycaenidae of South America
Lycaenidae genera
Taxa named by Harrison Gray Dyar Jr.